Major-General Nicholas Jeremy Cottam  (born 17 February 1951) was a senior British Army officer who went on to be Military Secretary and thereafter Registrar of St Paul's Cathedral.

Early life

Cottam is the son of Brigadier Donald Cottam OBE. He was educated at Durham University, where he gained a degree in Modern History. Cottam was President of the Durham Union for Easter term of 1972.

Military career
Cottam was commissioned into the Royal Green Jackets in 1973. He became Commanding Officer of his Regiment and was deployed in Northern Ireland in the early 1990s being appointed to the OBE and mentioned in despatches for his service there. In 1994 he went to South Africa as part of a Commonwealth Peace Keeping Force.

He became Director of Personnel Services in 2001 for the Army and went on to be General Officer Commanding 5th Infantry Division in 2003 and Military Secretary in 2005. In that role he increased the retirement age for officers in the Territorial Army to 60 and carried out a review of the Reserves recommending that they be used for augmentation as much as for maximum effort.

Cathedral Registrar
In 2008, after retirement from the Army, Cottam became Registrar of St Paul's Cathedral. In this position he returned to global prominence during the 2011-2012 Occupy London protests outside the cathedral buildings. He led the public response of the cathedral community to the protests, and made public statements on the resignations of three members of the cathedral's clergy including the Revd Canon Dr Giles Fraser; Cottam was reported to have been angered by Fraser's decision not to support agreed policy and to resign his position. Cottam retired in September 2015.

References

|-
 

 

1951 births
Living people
British Army major generals
Alumni of Van Mildert College, Durham
Companions of the Order of the Bath
Officers of the Order of the British Empire
Royal Green Jackets officers
British military personnel of The Troubles (Northern Ireland)
Presidents of the Durham Union